is a railway station on the Chitose Line and Muroran Main Line in Tomakomai, Hokkaido, Japan, operated by Hokkaido Railway Company (JR Hokkaido). The station is numbered "H17".

Lines
This station serves the Muroran Main and Chitose Lines. It is officially the terminus of the Chitose Line, although all trains terminate at Tomakomai Station.

Station layout
The station consists of one side platform and one island platform serving a total of three tracks. The station has automated ticket machines and Kitaca card readers (not equipped with regular ticket gates). The station is unattended.

Platforms

History
The station opened on 1 February 1898.

See also
 List of railway stations in Japan

References

Railway stations in Hokkaido Prefecture
Railway stations in Japan opened in 1898